DMG may refer to:

Organizations

Entertainment
 Dames Making Games, a Canadian non-profit organization that encourages the participation of women, non-binary, femme and queer people in the creation of video games
 Davidson Media Group, an American radio station holding company
 Diamante Music Group, a former American music record label distributor
 Disney Music Group, a record label group
 DMG Entertainment, a Chinese-based film production and distribution company
 DMG Nashville, a brand of Hollywood Records
 DMG Radio Australia, owner of the Nova and Classic Rock radio networks
 DMG TV, part of the British record label Demon Music Group

Other organizations
 Daily Mail and General Trust, an international media company
 Daimler Motoren Gesellschaft (now Daimler AG), an early German automobile manufacturer
 Deckel Maho Gildemeister, earlier name of DMG Mori Aktiengesellschaft, a German engineering company
 Deutsche Morgenländische Gesellschaft (German Oriental Society), organization that studies Asia and the Orient
 District Management Group, an elite cadre of the Civil Service of Pakistan, now known as the Pakistan Administrative Service
 DMG interpersonal, a club for Charities in Germany
 DMG Media, a national newspaper and website publisher in the UK
 DMG Mori Seiki Co., a Japanese tools manufacturing company
 D.M.G. Grupo Holding S.A., a Colombian company disbanded under the suspicion of money laundering

Science and technology
 Dimethylglycine, a derivative of the amino acid glycine
 Dimethylglyoxime, an organic chemical used in analysis as a precipitant for palladium or nickel
 Direct metalation group, the target of directed ortho metalation
 DMG, the official product code for the original Game Boy handheld video game system, which stands for Dot Matrix Game
 .dmg file, the Apple Disk Image, a file format used in the macOS computer operating system

Other uses
 Decoration for Merit in Gold, a South African military decoration
 DMG (rapper), a rapper from Saint Paul, Minnesota
 DMG 90, an edition of the Holden Commodore
 Dungeon Master's Guide, a rulebook for the game Dungeons & Dragons
 ISO 639:dmg or Kinabatangan language, a language of Malaysia
 Distinguished Master Guardian, Counter-Strike: Global Offensive competitive rank
 Distinguished Military Graduate